Gagea fedtschenkoana is an Asian species of plants in the lily family, native to Russia (Tuva, Altay Krai, Western Siberia Krai, Krasnoyarsk), China (Xinjiang), Kazakhstan, and Mongolia.

Gagea fedtschenkoana is a bulb-forming perennial up to 10 cm tall. Flowers are yellow tinged with green or purple.

References

External links
Flora of China Illustrations vol. 24, fig. 102, 2 in center line drawing of Gagea fedtschenkoana
Picsearch Services Gagea fedtschenkoana Pascher photo
Гусиный лук Федченко (Гусинолук Федченко) / Gagea fedtschenkoana Pascher  in Russian with color illustration

fedtschenkoana
Flora of Asia
Plants described in 1905